The Zagorka Cup is a professional tennis tournament played on outdoor red clay courts. It is currently part of the Association of Tennis Professionals (ATP) Challenger Tour. It is held annually in Sofia, Bulgaria, since 2009.

Past finals

Singles

Doubles

External links
ITF search

ATP Challenger Tour
Clay court tennis tournaments
Tennis tournaments in Bulgaria
Sports competitions in Sofia